Frederick Weekes (1834-1924) was an English painter and designer.  Son of the successful Victorian sculptor, Henry Weekes, two of his brothers also became artists, the genre and animal painters Herbert William Weekes and Henry Weekes Junior.

He established a long partnership with the architect William Burges, working with him on many of his major commissions, including Saint Fin Barre's Cathedral, Cardiff Castle, Castell Coch, the Yorkshire churches and Burges's own home in London, The Tower House.

Notes

19th-century English painters
English male painters
20th-century English painters
1833 births
1920 deaths
English designers
20th-century English male artists
19th-century English male artists